Firth is a Scottish word for a coastal water body.  It may also refer to:

Places
Canada
Firth River, a major river in Yukon, Canada

England
Firth Park (ward), an electoral ward in the City of Sheffield

Scotland
Firth, Orkney
Firth, Shetland

United States
Firth, Idaho, United States
Firth, Nebraska, United States

Other uses
Firth (surname)
Vic Firth Company, American percussion instrument manufacturing company
Firth, Pond & Company, American music company
"Firth of Fifth", song by British rock band Genesis, the title being a pun on the Firth of Forth in Scotland

See also 
 Frith